Chenar Bon-e Keshteli (also Romanized as Chenār Bon-e Keshtelī; also known as Chenār Bon) is a village in Gatab-e Shomali Rural District, Gatab District, Babol County, Mazandaran Province, Iran. At the 2006 census, its population was 460, in 113 families.

References 

Populated places in Babol County